Krasov is a municipality and village in the Czech Republic. Krasov or Krašov may also refer to:

Vysílač Krašov, a TV broadcasting facility in the Czech Republic
Krasov (surname)